Bewaldeth and Snittlegarth is a civil parish in the Allerdale district  of Cumbria, England, historically part of Cumberland, on the edge of the Lake District.

At the 2011 Census it was measured that the population was still less than 100.

According to Bulmer's History & Directory Of Cumberland (1901); "Snittlegarth ... is supposed to have been formerly a village of considerable magnitude. The word "Snittlegarth" is thought to signify an enclosure".

Governance
Bewaldeth and Snittlegarth is part of the parliamentary constituency of Workington. In the 2019 United Kingdom general election, the Tory candidate for Workington, Mark Jenkinson, was elected MP, overturning a 9.4 per cent Labour majority from the 2017 election to eject former Shadow Environment Secretary Sue Hayman by a margin of 4,136 votes. Until the December 2019 general election, the Labour Party had won the seat in every general election since 1979.The Conservative Party had only been elected once in Workington since World War II, at the 1976 by-election.

Before Brexit, for the European Parliament residents in Bewaldeth and Snittlegarth voted to elect MEP's for the North West England constituency.

For local government purposes it is in the Boltons ward of Allerdale Borough Council and the Bothel and Wharrels division of Cumbria County Council.

There is no parish council, only an annual parish meeting.

See also

Listed buildings in Bewaldeth and Snittlegarth

References

External links
 Cumbria County History Trust: Bewaldeth and Snittlegarth (nb: provisional research only – see Talk page)

Civil parishes in Cumbria
Allerdale